Oroperipatus soratanus is a species of velvet worm in the Peripatidae family. Females of this species have 32 pairs of legs; males have 28. The type locality is in Bolivia.

References

Onychophorans of tropical America
Onychophoran species
Animals described in 1901